No Cities Left is the second album by The Dears, released in 2003 on MapleMusic Recordings. It was the band's second full-length album of new material and was so successful that it was re-released in Canada in 2005.

The album features fellow Canadian indie-rocker Sam Roberts playing violin on "Never Destroy Us".

Track listing
All songs written by Murray Lightburn. 
 "We Can Have It" – 5:42
 "Who Are You, Defenders of the Universe?" – 3:41
 "Lost in the Plot" – 4:48
 "The Second Part" – 5:42
 "Don't Lose the Faith" – 3:10
 "Expect the Worst/'Cos She's a Tourist" – 7:52
 "Pinned Together, Falling Apart" – 6:01
 "Never Destroy Us" – 4:29
 "Warm and Sunny Days" – 5:47
 "22: The Death of All the Romance" – 5:56
 "Postcard from Purgatory" – 7:57
 "No Cities Left" – 5:23

"Don't Lose the Faith" was omitted from the original American release.

No Cities Left extended rerelease
The 2005 re-release of No Cities Left included "Don't Lose the Faith" and also the content of their EP Protest.

Videos
Videos were released for "Lost In The Plot" and "22: The Death of All the Romance".

Personnel
Murray Lightburn - Lead and background vocals, electric and acoustic guitar, Fender Rhodes, piano, melodica, midi programming, tambourine, maracas, handclaps
Natalia Yanchak - NordElectro organ and clavinet, piano, synthesizers, Fender Rhodes, lead and background vocals, handclaps
Martin Pelland - Bass guitar, background vocals, handclaps
George Donoso III - Drums, background vocals, handclaps
Valerie Jodoin-Keaton - background vocals, handclaps
Sam Roberts - Violin
Heather Schnarr - Violin
Matthew Perrin - Double Bass
Josh Fuhrman - Tenor Saxophone, baritone saxophone
Brigitte Mayes - Cello, synthesizers, Fender Rhodes, flute, background vocals, handclaps
The Brebeuf Brass : Matthew Watkins (trumpet), Chris Seligman (French horn) and Evan Cranley (Euphonium, trombone)

References

2003 albums
The Dears albums
MapleMusic Recordings albums